This is a list of seasons completed by the Miami Marlins, a professional baseball franchise based in Miami Gardens, Florida, originally the Florida Marlins from 1993 until 2011). The Marlins are a member of both the Major League Baseball's (MLB) National League Eastern Division and the National League (NL) itself. For the first nineteen seasons, the Marlins played their home games at Sun Life Stadium. Beginning with the  Season Marlins play home games at Marlins Park in Little Havana. Despite winning two World Series titles in their history (1997 and 2003), they are one of two MLB teams that have never won a division title in their history (the other being the Marlins' fellow expansion team from 1993, the Colorado Rockies).

Table key

Regular season results

These statistics are current as of the conclusion of the 2022 Major League Baseball season.
The 1994–95 Major League Baseball strike ended the season on August 11, as well as cancelling the entire postseason.  Because of this, no team was officially awarded any division titles.

Record by decade 
The following table describes the Marlins' MLB win–loss record by decade.

These statistics are from Baseball-Reference.com's Miami Marlins History & Encyclopedia.

Postseason record by year
The Marlins have made the postseason three times in their history, with their first being in 1997 and the most recent being in 2020.

See also
 Florida Marlins team records

References

 
Florida Marlins
Seasons